Hiroko Emura is a Japanese international lawn bowler.

Bowls career
Emura was selected as part of the five woman team by Japan for the 2020 World Outdoor Bowls Championship

She won a fours bronze medal (with Masako Satoh, Noriko Maebayashi and Atsumi Ono), at the 2011 Asia Pacific Bowls Championships in Adelaide.

References

Living people
Year of birth missing (living people)
Japanese bowls players